William Lennie (c. 1779–1852) was a Scottish grammarian. He was the author of textbooks on English grammar, including The Principles of English Grammar, which became a widely used textbook in British and American schools.

Life

Lennie was born in 1778 or 1779.

Lennie began his career as a teacher in Edinburgh in 1802. He authored textbooks on English grammar. His Principles of English Grammar was "universally used wherever the English language is spoken." Although remembered as a grammarian, all contemporary records list him as a "teacher of Geography" living at Alison Square.

In the 1830s, Peter Bullions, another Scottish grammarian, revised The Principles of English Grammar book and sold it in the United States.

Only later in life is Lennie listed as a "teacher of English", then living at 10 Nicolson Street. Around this time he inherited Ballochneck House near Drymen presumably from either his father or uncle.

Lennie died on 20 July 1852 aged 73 in Edinburgh. at home 23 St Andrew Square. He is then described as "William Lennie of Ballochneck, teacher". He is buried in the Grange Cemetery in south Edinburgh. The grave lies midway along the north wall.

Lennie had no wife or family and so left his estate to do good. His will, with other bequests, created four Lennie bursaries at Edinburgh University, for students seeking a literary education, that were notionally loans.

Selected works

References

External links
Works by William Lennie on the Internet Archive
Online Books by William Lennie on the Online Books Page

1770s births
1852 deaths
Writers from Edinburgh
Scottish grammarians
Burials at the Grange Cemetery
Philanthropists from Edinburgh